David Duane Jaynes (born December 12, 1952) is a former American football quarterback. He played in college at the University of Kansas, where he was selected to the 1973 College Football All-America Team. That same year, he was a finalist for the Heisman Trophy finishing fourth in voting. He was drafted in the third-round (66th overall selection) of the 1974 NFL Draft by the Kansas City Chiefs. He would play only one season in the NFL.

College career
Jaynes accepted a football scholarship from the University of Kansas. During the early 1970s, he broke virtually every passing record in Kansas history. When he left Kansas, he was first in passing, with 5,132 yards. This record held for ten years until broken in 1983 by Frank Seurer. He also left Kansas with the record for career passing touchdowns at 35, which held up until the 2007 season, when he was passed by Todd Reesing, who would shatter the record with 90.

Jaynes' most memorable game was in 1973 against SEC power Tennessee, when he completed 35 of 58 attempted passes for 394 yards in the 28-27 loss. In 1973 Kansas finished 7–4–1 and went to the Liberty Bowl. Jaynes finished fourth in the voting that year for the Heisman Trophy behind winner John Cappelletti, John Hicks, and Roosevelt Leaks. He also finished ahead of future two-time Heisman winner Archie Griffin. Jaynes is, to date, the only Heisman Trophy finalist in Kansas football history. He's one of 3 players to receive votes, along with John Hadl and Bobby Douglass

Professional career
Jaynes was drafted in the third round (66th overall) of the 1974 NFL Draft by the Kansas City Chiefs with whom he played two games that season, failing to complete either of his only two passing attempts, one of which was intercepted. He was also the first overall player selected in the World Football League during the inaugural 1974 WFL Draft by the Houston Texans, but never signed with them.

Personal life
In 2001, Jaynes married Barbara Harris, who was married to actor Cary Grant until Grant's death.

References

1952 births
Living people
American football quarterbacks
Kansas City Chiefs players
Kansas Jayhawks football players
All-American college football players
Sportspeople from Kansas City, Kansas
Players of American football from Kansas
People from Bonner Springs, Kansas